The Parthian shot is a light cavalry hit-and-run tactic made famous by the Parthians, an ancient Iranian people. While performing a real or feigned retreat at full gallop, the horse archers would turn their bodies back to shoot at the pursuing enemy.  The maneuver required superb equestrian skills, since the rider's hands were occupied by his composite bow and his body was twisted around.  As the stirrup had not been invented at the time of the Parthians, the rider relied solely on squeezing pressure from his legs to stay mounted and guide his horse.

History

In addition to the Parthians and their successors, the Sasanians, this tactic was used by most nomads of the Eurasian Steppe, including the Scythians, Huns, Turks, Magyars, Mongols, Koreans, as well as the Urartians and the Comanche.

The Parthians used the tactic to great effect in their victory over the Roman general Crassus in the Battle of Carrhae.

A tactic similar to the Parthian shot was attributed to the Phoenicians from Sidon by Silius Italicus.

The tactic was also used by Muslim conqueror Muhammad of Ghor in the Second Battle of Tarain in 1192 against Indian elephants, heavy cavalry and heavy infantry, by Alp Arslan in the Battle of Manzikert in 1071 against the Byzantines, and by Subutai in the Battle of Legnica in 1241 against Polish knights.

As metaphor
The term "Parthian shot" is also used as a metaphor to describe a barbed insult, delivered as the speaker departs.

Gallery

See also

 Feint
 Pyrrhic victory
 Caracole, a similar cavalry maneuver
 Cantabrian circle
 L'esprit de l'escalier, also called staircase wit

References

Further reading
 

Diversionary tactics
Maneuver tactics
Military history of the Parthian Empire